The 1931 Denver Pioneers football team was an American football team that represented the University of Denver as a member of the Rocky Mountain Conference (RMC) during the 1931 college football season. In their third and final season under head coach Jeff Cravath, the Pioneers compiled a 4–6 record (3–5 against conference opponents), finished eighth in the RMC, and were outscored by a total of 143 to 104.

Schedule

References

Denver
Denver Pioneers football seasons
Denver Pioneers football